DMPEA can refer to two subclasses of substituted phenethylamines:

Dimethoxy-phenethylamines
 2,3-Dimethoxyphenethylamine
 2,4-Dimethoxyphenethylamine
 2,5-Dimethoxyphenethylamine
 2,6-Dimethoxyphenethylamine
 3,4-Dimethoxyphenethylamine (homoveratrylamine)
 3,5-Dimethoxyphenethylamine

Dimethyl-phenethylamines
 α,α-Dimethylphenethylamine (Phentermine)
 N,α-Dimethylphenethylamine (Methamphetamine)
 2,α-Dimethylphenethylamine (Ortetamine)
 3,α-Dimethylphenethylamine 
 4,α-Dimethylphenethylamine 
 N,N-Dimethylphenethylamine